Polmos  Białystok is one of the largest producers of alcoholic beverages in Poland. As of 2010, the firm's president was Henryk Wnorowski. Between 2005 and 2007 the company's stock was traded on the Warsaw Stock Exchange.

The firm was founded in 1928, under the control of "Polmos", an acronym for "Polski Monopol Spirytusowy" (Polish Spirits Monopoly), a state owned monopoly in distilled spirits. In 1936 the factories of the firm were moved to Brześć Litewski (now Brest, Belarus). The manufacturing was returned to Białystok in 1945 under the name Białostocka Wytwórnia Wódek (Białystok Vodka Manufacturer). The production facilities were expanded in 1970, when new factories were built in other parts of the city, which became operational two years later. The firm also has several smaller production plants spread across the Podlaskie Voivodeship. In 1991 the firm became independent of government control. In 1998 it was transformed into a proprietorship under the control of the state treasury, under the name Przedsiębiorstwo "Polmos" Białystok Spółka Akcyjna (Manufacturer "Polmos" Stock Company of Białystok). Currently the firm produces more than 30 million liters of liquor annually.

The best known of the company's brands is Żubrówka, or the Bison Grass Vodka.

Brands 
 Absolwent
 Absolwent Gin, Cytrynowy, Morelowy, Bananowy, Żurawina, Mixt Lemon, Mixt Grapefruit
 Batory
 Białowieska
 Biały Bocian
 Cytrynówka
 Czekoladowa
 Kiermusianka Biała Szlachecka
 Kiermusianka Wykwintna Acańska
 Kiermusianka Chrzanówka
 Kompleet Vodka
 Liberty Blue
 Lider
 Ludowa
 Nalewka Pałacowa Wiśniowa
 Nalewka Pałacowa Miodowa
 Palace
 Winiak Białostocki
 Winiak Pałacowy
 Wódka
 Imbirowa
 Złota Gorzka
 Złota Gorzka z miętą
 Żubrówka

References

External links

Alcoholic drink companies
Companies based in Białystok
Drink companies of Poland